Vice Admiral Krishna Swaminathan, AVSM, VSM is a serving Flag officer in the Indian Navy. He currently serves as the Chief of Staff of the Western Naval Command. He earlier served as the Flag Officer Defence Advisory Group (FODAG), Flag Officer Commanding Western Fleet (FOCWF) and Flag Officer Sea Training (FOST). He was the second Commanding Officer of the aircraft carrier INS Vikramaditya.

Early life and education
Krishna was born to D. Swaminathan and Shanta Swaminathan, both teachers, in Bangalore. The Swaminathans resided in NR Colony in Basavanagudi. He attended the Bishop Cotton Boys' School until the age of 11. He then attended the Sainik School, Bijapur. He then joined and graduated from the National Defence Academy, Pune.

Naval career 
Krishna was commissioned into the Indian Navy on 1 July 1987. He is a specialist in Communication and Electronic Warfare.
He has completed the staff course at the Joint Services Command and Staff College, Shrivenham in the United Kingdom and the higher command course at the College of Naval Warfare in Mumbai. He has also attended the Naval War College, Newport, Rhode Island in the United States.

Krishna has commanded five front-line ships of the Indian Navy.

On 2 November 2015, Krishna took command of the flagship of the Indian Navy, the  aircraft carrier  as its second commanding officer. He has served on the staff of the Western Fleet, has served as an instructor at the Defence Services Staff College, Wellington. As a Commodore, he served as the Naval Assistant (NA) to the Chief of the Naval Staff, Admiral Robin K. Dhowan.

Flag rank
On promotion to Flag Rank, Krishna took over as the Chief Staff Officer (Training) (CSO (Trg)) at the Southern Naval Command, the training command of the Indian Navy, at Kochi. On 18 March 2019, he assumed the office of Flag Officer Sea Training (FOST), also at Kochi. As FOST, his charter included the conduct of the operational sea training of all ships of the Indian Navy and the Indian Coast Guard.

Krishna took command of the Western Fleet on 14 February 2020 as the Flag Officer Commanding Western Fleet. For his command of the western fleet, on 26 January 2021, he was awarded the Ati Vishisht Seva Medal. In February 2021, he relinquished command of the Western Fleet and was appointed Flag Officer Defence Advisory Group and took over from Rear Admiral Ravindra Jayant Nadkarni. After a short stint as FODAG, on  4 November 2021, he was promoted to the rank of Vice Admiral and appointed Chief of Staff of the Western Naval Command at Mumbai.

Personal life
Krishna is married to Laila Swaminathan. The couple has two daughters.

Awards and decorations

Source:

See also
 Flag Officer Commanding Western Fleet
 Western Fleet
 INS Vikramaditya

References 

Indian Navy admirals
Living people
Bishop Cotton Boys' School alumni
Sainik School alumni
National Defence Academy (India) alumni
Naval War College alumni
Flag Officers Commanding Western Fleet
Flag Officers Sea Training
Recipients of the Ati Vishisht Seva Medal
Recipients of the Vishisht Seva Medal
Military personnel from Bangalore
Date of birth missing (living people)
Year of birth missing (living people)
Tyabji family
Graduates of Joint Services Command and Staff College
Academic staff of the Defence Services Staff College